Koti Sana is a 1999 Sri Lankan Sinhala action thriller film directed by Ranjith Siriwardena and co-produced by Sonia Disa for Sonia Films and Sunil T. Fernando for Sunil T. Films. It stars Jeevan Kumaratunga and Dilhani Ekanayake in lead roles along with Anusha Damayanthi, Sonia Disa, and Bandu Samarasinghe. Music composed by Somapala Ratnayake. It is the 923rd Sri Lankan film in the Sinhala cinema.

Plot

Cast
 Jeevan Kumaratunga as Koti Sana
 Dilhani Ekanayake
 Anusha Damayanthi
 Sonia Disa as Koti Sana's mother
 Bandu Samarasinghe
 Chunky Ipalawatte
 Cletus Mendis
 Nayana Kumari
 Harshani Dissanayake
 Thilak Jayaweera
 Susila Kottage
 Alexander Fernando
 Susan Fernando
 Eric Francis
 Premadasa Vithanage

Soundtrack

References

1999 films
1990s Sinhala-language films